N15 may refer to:

Roads
 N15 road (Belgium), a National Road in Belgium
 Route nationale 15, in France
 N15 road (Ireland)
 A15 motorway (Netherlands) 
 Nebraska Highway 15, in the United States

Vehicles 
 , a submarine of the Royal Navy
 LNER Class N15, a British 0-6-2 steam locomotive class
 LSWR N15 class, a British 4-6-0 steam locomotive
 Nissan Almera (N15), a Japanese automobile sold in Europe
 Nissan Pulsar (N15), a Japanese automobile sold domestically

Other uses
 N15 (Long Island bus), New York
 Enterobacteria phage N15
 Kingston Airport (Nevada), in Lander County, Nevada, United States
 London Buses route N15
 Nitrogen-15, an isotope of nitrogen
 Tonga language (Malawi)
 N15, a postcode district in the N postcode area

See also
 15N (disambiguation)